George Stuart Gordon (14 June 1902 – 4 October 1990) was an Australian rules footballer who played with Fitzroy in the Victorian Football League (VFL).

Notes

External links 

1902 births
1990 deaths
Australian rules footballers from Melbourne
Fitzroy Football Club players
People from Brighton, Victoria